Richie Campbell (born 18 September 1987) is an Australian water polo player who competed in the 2008, 2012 and 2016 Summer Olympics. He has played professionally in Barcelona, Spain and currently plays for the UNSW Wests Magpies in the Australian National Water-polo League.
Campbell competed at the Junior World Cup 2005 and 2007. He won a bronze medal in the World League super finals in 2007.

Campbell was picked in the water polo Sharks squad to compete in the men's water polo tournament at the 2020 Summer Olympics. Coached by  Elvis Fatović, the team finished joint fourth on points in their pool but their inferior goal average meant they finished fifth overall and out of medal contention. They were able to upset Croatia in a group stage match 11–8. Australia at the 2020 Summer Olympics details the results in depth.

References

External links
 

1987 births
Living people
Australian male water polo players
Olympic water polo players of Australia
Water polo players at the 2008 Summer Olympics
Water polo players at the 2012 Summer Olympics
Sportspeople from Newcastle, New South Wales
Water polo players at the 2016 Summer Olympics
Water polo players at the 2020 Summer Olympics